Wan Qian (born 14 May 1982), also known as Regina Wan, is a Chinese actress and singer. She won Golden Horse Award for Best Supporting Actress for the 2014 Taiwanese film Paradise in Service and the Beijing College Student Film Festival for Best Actress for the 2016 film The Insanity.

Early life 
Wan Qian was born in Heshan District, Yiyang, Hunan. She was heavily influenced by her father when she was young. During her childhood, her father always took her to practice vocally, cultivating her love of singing.

A haphazard chance made her enroll into the acting undergraduate program at the Shanghai Theatre Academy (STA). During her student life at the Shanghai Theatre Academy, she represented STA as the leading actress to join the international theatre festivals that were held in Romania, Hong Kong and the United States. After graduation, she was recruited into a record company in Beijing.

Personal life 
On 9 November 2017, Wan Qian gave birth to her daughter at Shanghai. She also posted a short video on Weibo and officially announced it on 10 November 2017.

Filmography

Film

Television series

Variety show

Discography

Albums

Singles

Awards and nominations

References

External links

1982 births
Actresses from Hunan
Shanghai Theatre Academy alumni
21st-century Chinese actresses
Chinese television actresses
Chinese film actresses
Singers from Hunan
People from Yiyang
Chinese Mandopop singers
Chinese stage actresses
Living people
21st-century Chinese women singers